The 2017 European Cross Country Championships was the 24th edition of the cross country running competition for European athletes. It was hosted in Šamorín, Slovakia. As of the 2017 edition, the first three athletes from each nation counted towards the team standings, rather than the top four of previous years.

Medal summary

Race results

Senior men

Senior women

Senior mixed relay

Under-23 men

Under-23 women

Junior men

Junior women

Medal table

References

Results
Senior Men. European Athletics. Retrieved 2017-12-15.
Senior Women. European Athletics. Retrieved 2017-12-15.
Senior Mixed relay. European Athletics. Retrieved 2017-12-15.
Under-23 Men. European Athletics. Retrieved 2017-12-15.
Under-23 Women. European Athletics. Retrieved 2017-12-15.
Under-20 Men. European Athletics. Retrieved 2017-12-15.
Under-20 Women. European Athletics. Retrieved 2017-12-15.

External links
Official website 

International athletics competitions hosted by Slovakia
2017 in Slovak sport
European Cross Country Championships
December 2017 sports events in Europe